Shirane is a Japanese ship.

Shirane may also refer to:
Shirane-class destroyer, a class of destroyers in the Japan Maritime Self-Defense Force
Mount Nikkō-Shirane, a shield volcano in Nikkō National Park, Japan
Mount Kusatsu-Shirane, an active volcano in Kusatsu, Gunma, Japan
Minami-Alps, Yamanashi, the new name for Shirane town in Japan

Japanese surname 
 , Imperial Japanese Navy officer
 Gen Shirane (1924–2005), Japanese-American physicist
 Haruo Shirane (born 1951), Japanese-American professor of Japanese literature and culture

See also 
 Shirani (disambiguation)